1581 Abanderada, provisional designation , is a dark Themistian asteroid from the outer regions of the asteroid belt, approximately 35 kilometers in diameter. It was discovered on 15 June 1950, by Argentine astronomer Miguel Itzigsohn at the La Plata Astronomical Observatory in La Plata, Argentina. The asteroid was named after Eva Perón.

Orbit and classification 

Abanderada is a Themistian asteroid that belongs to the Themis family, a very large family of carbonaceous asteroids, named after 24 Themis. It orbits the Sun in the outer main-belt at a distance of 2.8–3.5 AU once every 5 years and 7 months (2,049 days). Its orbit has an eccentricity of 0.12 and an inclination of 3° with respect to the ecliptic.

The body's observation arc begins with a precovery image taken at Lowell Observatory in September 1929, or almost 21 years prior to its official discovery observation at La Plata.

Physical characteristics 

In the Tholen classification, the asteroid's spectral type is ambiguous. It is closest to a bright carbonaceous B-type and somewhat similar to the common C-type asteroids. Tholen has also flagged the asteroid's spectra as "unusual" (BCU).

Lightcurves 

In March 2011, a rotational lightcurve of Abanderada was obtained from photometric observations by French amateur astronomers Pierre Antonini. The lightcurve with a period of 19.2 hours was later retracted due to its poor quality. As of 2017, the body's effective rotation period, poles and shape remain unknown.

Diameter and albedo 

According to the survey carried out by the NEOWISE mission of NASA's Wide-field Infrared Survey Explorer, Abanderada measures between 29.508 and 31.74 kilometers in diameter and its surface has an albedo between 0.06 and 0.093, while the Japanese Akari satellite found a diameter of 36.49 kilometers with an albedo of 0.061.

The Collaborative Asteroid Lightcurve Link adopts the results obtained by the Infrared Astronomical Satellite, that is, an albedo of 0.0523 and a diameter of 39.28 kilometers based on an absolute magnitude of 10.85.

Naming 

This minor planet was named in after Eva Perón (1919–1952), wife of President Juan Perón (1895–1974) of Argentina. The name "Abanderada" may be translated from Spanish as "woman with a banner"—an appellation frequently used in reference to her as a crusader for social and political change.

The discoverer also named the asteroids 1569 Evita, 1582 Martir, 1588 Descamisada and 1589 Fanatica in tribute to Eva Perón. The official  was published by the Minor Planet Center in January 1953.

References

External links 
 Asteroid Lightcurve Database (LCDB), query form (info )
 Dictionary of Minor Planet Names, Google books
 Asteroids and comets rotation curves, CdR – Observatoire de Genève, Raoul Behrend
 Discovery Circumstances: Numbered Minor Planets (1)-(5000) – Minor Planet Center
 
 

001581
Discoveries by Miguel Itzigsohn
Named minor planets
001581
19500615